The 2009 Mongolian National Championship was the forty-second recorded edition of top flight football in Mongolia and the fourteenth season of the Mongolian Premier League, which took over as the highest level of competition in the country from the previous Mongolian National Championship. Ulaanbaatar DS were champions, their first title, Erchim were  runners up, with Khasiin Khulguud in third place.

Participating teams

 Erchim – Ulaanbaatar Power Plant team
 Khangarid – Erdenet; town in northern Mongolia
 Kharaatsai – Ulaanbaatar
 Khasiin Khulguud – Bank team from Ulaanbaatar
 Khoromkhon – Ulaanbaatar
 Selenge Press – Ulaanbaatar
 Mazaalai – Ulaanbaatar
 Ulaanbaatar DS – team from Ulaanbaatar University, also known as UBDES

Format
The 2006 season consisted of three distinct stages: the first stage consisted of a single group of eight teams all playing each other in a single round robin of matches. From this, the top six teams then qualified for the second stage, where they were split into two groups which again played a single round robin of matches. From this, the top two teams in each group qualified for single legged semi finals with the bottom teams progressing directly to the fifth place match.

First stage

League table

Results

Second stage

Group A

Table

Results

Group B

Table

Results

Third stage

Semi finals

Fifth place match

Third place match

Final

References

Mongolia Premier League seasons
Mongolia
Mongolia
football